Kaliganj is an upazila of Lalmonirhat District in the Division of Rangpur, Bangladesh.

History
Kaliganj Upazila has been named after Kali Prasad Roy Chowdhury, Ghosal Brahmin zamindar raja of Tushbhandar Zamindari.

Geography
It has 35,459 households and total area of 236.96 km2.

Demographics
As of the 1991 Bangladesh census, Kaliganj has a population of 187,494. Males constitute 51.48% of the population, and females 48.52%. This Upazila's eighteen up population is 89,669. Kaliganj has an average literacy rate of 24% (7+ years), and a national average of 32.4% are literate.

Administration
Kaliganj Upazila is divided into eight union parishads: Bhotemari, Chalbala, Chandrapur, Dalagram, Goral, Kakina, Madati, and Tushbhandar. The union parishads are subdivided into 64 mauzas and 92 villages.

See also
Upazilas of Bangladesh
Districts of Bangladesh
Divisions of Bangladesh

References

Upazilas of Lalmonirhat District